Workers' Democracy may refer to:
Workers' Democracy (Cyprus)
Workers' Democracy (Poland)